Preston Earnest Smith (March 8, 1912 – October 18, 2003) was an American entrepreneur and politician who served as the 40th governor of Texas from 1969 to 1973, who previously served as the lieutenant governor from 1963 to 1969.

Early life
Smith was born into a tenant farming family of 13 children in Corn Hill, a town in Williamson County, Texas, that has since been absorbed into nearby Jarrell. The family later moved to Lamesa, Texas, where Smith graduated in 1928 from Lamesa High School. In 1934, he graduated from Texas Technological College (now Texas Tech University) in Lubbock with a bachelor's degree in business administration. Staying in Lubbock, he founded a movie theater business and invested in real estate.

Political career

Smith was first elected to the Texas House of Representatives in 1944 and then to the Texas State Senate in 1956.

Smith's inauguration on January 21, 1969, had what was called "the flavor of the South Plains". The Texas Tech University marching band led the parade just behind the marshal and the color guard. A mounted masked Red Raider rode with the band. Governor and Mrs. Smith, both Tech graduates, followed in an open convertible. Other Smith family members rode in the parade, followed by the new lieutenant governor, Ben Barnes. The band of Lamesa High School, Smith's alma mater, was the first among the high school groups. Before the oath taking, the first to be televised in Texas history, Smith had been feted with a $25-per-place victory dinner in the Austin Municipal Auditorium, now the Long Center for the Performing Arts.

In 1971 and 1972, Smith was embroiled in the Sharpstown scandal stock fraud scheme, which eventually led to his downfall. Smith lost his third-term bid for the governorship of Texas to Dolph Briscoe of Uvalde in the Democratic primary in 1972.

Later life and attempted political comeback

He didn’t

References

External links
 Programs for people, by Preston Smith, published 1973, hosted by the Portal to Texas History.
http://www.lubbockonline.com/stories/020508/obi_243811655.shtml
Papers, 1930-1975 and undated, in the Southwest Collection/Special Collections Library at Texas Tech University

1912 births
2003 deaths
Burials at Texas State Cemetery
Democratic Party governors of Texas
Lieutenant Governors of Texas
Democratic Party members of the Texas House of Representatives
People from Lubbock, Texas
People from Lamesa, Texas
Democratic Party Texas state senators
Texas Tech University alumni
20th-century American politicians
American United Methodists
20th-century Methodists